Kjersti Alveberg (26 July 1948 – 19 October 2021) was a Norwegian choreographer and dancer. Over the last 30 years of her career she created ballets for stage and television and won prestigious awards for her work.

Early life
Kjersti Alveberg began to dance at the age of four, but not until she was 19 she took the decisive step of starting her dance studies at Norwegian National Academy of Ballet in Oslo, working at the same time at Chat Noir as a dancer. Aiming at sociology she went on to study dance in New York City, Amsterdam, London and Paris before attending the Nansen Academy. For several years she was a freelance dancer at the Oslo theatres, in fringe groups and in television. For 5 years she was a dancer, actor and singer at Det Norske Teatret doing musicals and plays, also working in TV and in fringe dance companies. Her choreographic debut came in 1975, with "Tomorrow?" at The Norwegian Opera's Ballet Workshop.

Breakthrough

In 1984 Kjersti won international acclaim, when her TV ballet "Beyond Reach" achieved 3rd prize in Prix Italia. The same year the Norwegian dance and theatre critics chose her ballet as that year's best stage production. The "Ashes, Mist, Windblown Dust", inspired by Ibsen's Peer Gynt, was awarded the jury's Special Prize in Prix Italia 1986 plus other national and international TV awards. TV producer Jannike Falk certainly has contributed to the success of Kjersti Alveberg's many dance films, well worth mentioning is "Who is the one?"/"Bønn" (1996) to new music by Jan Garbarek and poems by Rumi. Alveberg has also cooperated with producer Stein Roger Bull. "Dance Macabre" (1995) is one of several NRK ballets made for The Eurovision Summer Concert at Holmenkollen. Kjersti Alveberg has choreographed several ballets for New Carte Blanche: "Amber" and "Echo", both televised in NRK. When establishing stately support for Carte Blanche, (Norway's modern dance company), Alveberg was an artistic front figure. In 1990 her full length ballet: "Volven", (Scandinavian saga of creation), premiered at The Norwegian National Ballet with music by Synne Skouen, later touring Denmark, Aalborg and The Royal Danish Opera. In 2000 The Norwegian National Ballet presented "Volven" for the third time. "Volven", (the Norse goddess of destiny) was first danced in 1989 by Indra Lorentzen, in 1994 by Nina Bjørsvik and in 2000 by Ingrid Lorentzen. "Volven" has been said to be the most grandiose and poetic epos created by a Norwegian choreographer so far.

In 1991 she won the prestigious competition of ideas for the Norwegian Olympic Ceremonies. The Lillehammer Opening Ceremony in 1994 was built on her concept of ideas. Kjersti was artistic leader for the Olympic Ceremonies for 1 year, with choreographer Sølvi Edvardsen as her co-director. In 1992 she created Norway's presentation at the Winter Olympics in Albertville, France.

"Babies of Babel" was created for The Norwegian National Ballet in 1998. "Journey On Dreamt Ocean" in 2001 was inspired by the universe of painter Terje Ytjhall.

 In 2005 she released her book Visions. Eye On Dance. Press publishing house. Her declaration of love for dance as an art form
 In 2005 she was appointed artistic director for the opening ceremony of The Norwegian National Library.
 In 2007 she created the cross-over performance:"@lice", commissioned by Concerts Norway and The Norwegian national touring theatre.
 In 2008 she directed and edited "@lice" for TV with Mats Claesson/Sarah Rosenbaum. Exposed in NRK2 2009.
 In 2009 she was appointed head of the jury for Telenor's International Culture prize.

Alveberg's ballets have always been thematically oriented - many were inspired by art, philosophy, poetry and music. Norwegian TV has created two portrait programs about Kjersti Alveberg: "Metropolis" (1990) and "Dance Me!" (2003). Produced by Morten Tomte and Jannike Falk.

Personal life and death
Kjersti was the older of two sisters, Siri and Eli. Her parents: Per Alveberg (1921–2009), a pioneer of rehabilitation/ social worker. Kari Alveberg,(1926) specialized teacher/children with learning disabilities. Kjersti was married to journalist Anders Hoff in Oslo 1981–89. From 1990 to 2000 she lived with chiropractor Knut Assjer in Asker. Kjersti has one son, Noah Alveberg. 

Kjersti died on 19 October 2021 at the age of 73.

Productions

Publications
Visions - Eye on Dance Press Forlag (2007)

Visions – Eye on Dance is her declaration of love for dance as an art form. It is also a jewel of a book, a pictorial documentation of her unique private universe. All of her most important stage and screen productions are presented here in large format in the form of digital paintings.
Alveberg's ballets have always been thematically oriented, many were inspired by classical literature and art. Her stage interpretations have been like great tableaux on canvas, depicting a wondrous fantasy world.
In this book, she also takes us behind the scenes, into the workshop, without breaking the spell.
Visions permits readers to make their own journey into Alveberg's world.

Awards and honours

 2008: Aase Bye's award
 2006: StudySphere selected Alveberg's website as one of the best educational resources on the Web in the category "Choreography & Choreographers"
 2005: Visions — Eye on Dance, Biography of Alveberg
 Head of the Telenor Culture Award jury
 2002: Oslo City Culture Award
 1998: The Norwegian Center for the Art of Dance — Prize of Honour
 1997: Telenor Culture Award. "Limitless Communication"
 1996: Festival International. Program Audiovisuel. "Dance Macabre"
 1994: Video Dance International Grand Prix. "Echo", TV ballet, First prize. TV Transmission
 1990: Video Dance International Grand Prix. "Fragile", TV ballet
 1989: Video Dance International Grand Prix. "Ashes, Mist, Windblown Dust", Jury's special Award (two prizes)
 1988: Dance on Camera, New York. "Ashes, Mist, Windblown Dust"
 1987: Amanda Award/(Norwegian Oscar). "Ashes, Mist, Windblown Dust" (Free Artistic)
 1985: Prix Italia Jury's special Award. "Ashes, Mist, Windblown Dust"
 1985: Dance Critics' Award "Now"
 1985: Prix Italia, third prize. "Beyond Reach"
 1984: Oslo City art award

References

External links

 
Kjersti Alveberg, ASHES MIST, WINDBLOWN DUST, NRK 1986 on YouTube

1948 births
2021 deaths
Entertainers from Oslo
Norwegian female dancers
Norwegian choreographers